Under the Constellation Gemini is a 1979 Soviet science fiction film directed by Boris Ivchenko based on the short story The Guest by Igor Rosokhovatsky.

Plot
In one of the research institutes, the artificial brain Sigom, created under the guidance of Professor Yavorovsky, has disappeared. And also in the city there are strange phenomena: all the animals of the zoo are released from the cages, the books of the city information center are in disarray. And Sigom, having mastered the knowledge of science and fiction accumulated by mankind, he himself creates an artificial organism, returns to the professor and is soon sent to the constellation of Gemini.

Cast
Vsevolod Gavrilov - Alexander
Nikolaevich Yavorovsky - Academician
Gennady Shkuratov - Shigom
Boris Belov - Semyon Antonovich Tarnov, Colonel of the Militia
Gulcha Tashbaeva - Maria
Alexander Pavlov - the commander of the aircraft
Georgy Grechko - cameo
Yaroslav Gavrilyuk - security guard
Ivan Mykolaichuk - member of the crew of the aircraft
Vyacheslav Zholobov - Dyatlov, a specialist in robotics
Yury Rudchenko - policeman
Zemfira Tsakhilova - Tatiana Vladimirovna, referent

References

External links

Soviet science fiction films
1970s science fiction films
Dovzhenko Film Studios films
Films based on works by Russian writers